Byron Donald Storer (born May 1, 1984) is an American football coach and former fullback who is the assistant special teams coach for the Green Bay Packers of the National Football League (NFL). He previously coached for the Tampa Bay Buccaneers, San Diego Chargers, and Las Vegas Raiders.  Storer played for the Tampa Bay Buccaneers from 2007 to 2009. He played college football at California.

Early years
In 2002, Storer graduated from Central Catholic High School  in Modesto, California.

Playing career

College
Storer played at University of California, Berkeley and was second-team All-Pac-10 special teams in 2006.

National Football League

Tampa Bay Buccaneers
Storer signed with the Tampa Bay Buccaneers in May 2007 and started the final three games of the season, finishing with two receptions for three yards.

An exclusive-rights free agent in the 2009 offseason, Storer was re-signed on March 17. He reached an injury settlement with the Buccaneers on May 17 and was placed on injured reserve. 

Storer retired after spending the 2008 and 2009 season on injured reserve due to tearing his ACL.

Coaching career

Tampa Bay Buccaneers
Storer was hired by the Tampa Bay Buccaneers as an assistant special teams coach. Following the Buccaneers 4-12 record for the 2011 season Raheem Morris and his entire coaching staff were fired.

San Diego Chargers
In 2012, Storer was hired by the San Diego Chargers as special teams assistant. He was moved to assistant linebackers coach in 2013.

Oakland Raiders
In 2018, Storer was hired by the Oakland Raiders as special teams assistant.

Green Bay Packers
On February 15, 2022, Storer was hired by the Green Bay Packers as their assistant special teams coach.

References

1984 births
Living people
Sportspeople from Modesto, California
Players of American football from California
American football fullbacks
California Golden Bears football players
Tampa Bay Buccaneers players
Tampa Bay Buccaneers coaches
San Diego Chargers coaches
Oakland Raiders coaches
Las Vegas Raiders coaches
Green Bay Packers coaches

External links
 Green Bay Packers bio